Rayaru Bandaru Mavana Manege is a 1993 Indian Kannada-language romantic drama film directed by Dwarakish and produced by P. Balaram. The film stars Vishnuvardhan along with Dolly Minhas and Bindiya. The music is scored by Raj–Koti and audio by Lahari Music.

The film is a remake of director Priyadarshan's Malayalam film Chithram (1988) starring Mohanlal and Ranjini.

Plot
Suma is the only daughter of a rich NRI Ramachandra Raya. Suma lives with Shyam in India. Suma decides to marry her lover even though he is not accepted by her father. On their wedding day, the groom ditches her as she cannot inherit her father's property.  Ramachandra Raya is now ready to accept his new son-in-law and decides to stay with him for a fortnight in his estate. As his health is already in a bad condition, Shyam and Suma do not tell Ramachandra Raya what had happened on the day of wedding. Shyam comes across Vishnu who is in need of money. He asks him to act like Suma's husband before Ramachandra Raya to which he agrees.  Initially Suma and Vishnu keep picking fights with each other. Gradually Suma starts feelings for Vishnu.  After a few days Vishnu has a visitor.  He tells Suma and Shyam about Vishnu's past. In the flashback we see that Vishnu was married to a mute teacher Shivaranjini, had a child and lead a happy life. Later an unknown man begins visiting his wife while she was alone.  This aroused suspicion in Vishnu's mind who one day catches hold of that man and have a fight with him.  In this duel, Shivaranjini dies. Later it is revealed that the man was her brother and met her in secret because he was a naxalite.  Vishnu lands in jail for killing his wife. Back in the present,  Vishnu had escaped from the jail to gather money for his child's surgery.  It is revealed that Vishnu's visitor is the jail warden.  The warden says that Vishnu is sentenced to death and that nothing could be done for this. After the completion of 14 days vacation,  Ramachandra Raya returns. In the end we see Suma bidding a tearful goodbye to Vishnu who will be executed soon.

Cast
 Vishnuvardhan as Vishnu, a photographer
 Dolly as Suma 
 Bindiya as Shivaranjini
 Dwarakish as Shyam
 C. R. Simha as Ramachandra Rayaru
 Vajramuni 
 Sihi Kahi Chandru 
 Shivakumar
 Vasanth Kunigal
Junior Narasimharaju 
Bangalore Nagesh

Soundtrack
The music of the film was composed by Raj–Koti. Raj- Koti reused "Adivi deviya" in the Telugu movie Bangaru Bullodu. The soundtrack consisted one Thyagaraja kriti "Nagumomu" performed by K. J. Yesudas

References

1993 films
1990s Kannada-language films
1993 romantic drama films
Kannada remakes of Malayalam films
Indian romantic drama films
Films directed by Dwarakish